is a volcanic Japanese island in the Philippine Sea. It is one of the Izu Seven Islands group of the seven northern islands of the Izu archipelago. The island is the smaller inhabited component of the village of Niijima, which also contains the larger, neighboring island of Niijima and the smaller, uninhabited Jinai-tō. It is part of the Ōshima Subprefecture of Tokyo Metropolis. , the island's population was 600. Shikinejima is also within the boundaries of the Fuji-Hakone-Izu National Park.

Geology
Shikine-jima has an irregular and highly indented coastline with many small bays. Shikinejima is approximately 3 km long by 2.5 km wide. Signs of geothermal activity can be found along the southern coast where hot springs occur. The legend that Niijima and Shikinejima were formerly one island, and were separated by a giant tsunami during the 1703 Genroku earthquake has no basis in geology.

Important Bird Area
The island, along with Nii-jima and some uninhabited islets nearby, have been recognised as an Important Bird Area (IBA) by BirdLife International because they support populations of Japanese murrelets, Japanese wood pigeons, Pleske's grasshopper warblers, Ijima's leaf-warblers and Izu thrushes.

History
The history of human settlement on Shikine-jima dates to prehistoric times, and archaeologists have found number remains from the Jōmon period on the island. With plentiful water and seafood from the warm Kuroshio Current, there is a continuous record of habitation on the island from the Heian period through the Edo period. Convict boats on their way to or from Hachijō-jima frequently spotted at Shikine-jima waiting for favorable winds.

In the Meiji period, the island was base for commercial fishing and salt production. In the modern period, tourism based on sports fishing, hot spring resorts, and water sports dominates the economy.

Access to Shikine-jima is by ferry from Takeshiba Sanbashi Pier in Tokyo, operated by Tokai Kisen.  Ferries also leave from Shimoda Shizuoka Prefecture.  A village operated ferry also makes several daily crossings between Niijima and Shikinejima.  The crossing is approximately 10 minutes.

Education
The island has one elementary school, Shikinejima Elementary School and one junior high school, Shikinejima Junior High School. High school students either travel by ferry, daily, to Niijima to attend Niijima High School or attend a boarding school elsewhere.

See also 
 List of islands of Japan
 Izu Islands

References

External links

Shikinejima homepage, in Japanese
Secret Japan's description of Shikinejima
ShikineJima experience
Tokai Kisen Ferry, in Japanese
Trip to ShikineJima
Recreation in Shikinejima

Izu Islands
Islands of Tokyo
Important Bird Areas of the Nanpo Islands
Seabird colonies